is a Japanese four-panel manga series written and illustrated by Masaki Andō. It was serialized in Ichijinsha's Monthly Comic Rex magazine from May 2016 to September 2022. An anime television series adaptation by Saetta aired from April to June 2019, with a second season airing from January to March 2020. A third season aired from January to March 2021. A fourth season aired from April to June 2022.

Plot
High school student Tohiska Jin moves from Tokyo to Nagoya where he learns through his new schoolmate Monaka Yatogame and her friends about the peculiarities of life in his new hometown and the quirks of its inhabitants.

Characters

Media

Manga
Masaki Andō launched the manga in Ichijinsha's shōnen manga magazine Monthly Comic Rex on May 28, 2016. It ended serialization on September 27, 2022.

Anime
An anime adaptation was announced in the fourth volume of the manga on May 26, 2018. The television series is directed by Hisayoshi Hirasawa, with animation by studio Saetta. Satsuki Hayasaka is the character designer, and WORDS in STEREO is credited for series composition. Creators in Pack is credited with  animation cooperation. The series premiered from April 4 to June 20, 2019, and was broadcast on TVA, Tokyo MX, and AT-X. Haruka Tomatsu performed the series' opening theme song "Deluxe Deluxe Happy".

After the series' finale, it was announced that the series would receive a second season. The season, titled , premiered from January 5 to March 22, 2020, with the cast and staff reprising their roles. LEVELS joins Creators in Pack in the animation cooperation.  +α/Alphakyun performed the second season's opening theme song "Imaginary Love".  The second season will run for 12 episodes.

On September 25, 2020, it was announced that the series will receive a third season.  The season, titled , aired from January 10 to March 28, 2021, with the cast and staff reprising once again their roles.  The opening theme song is  performed by Taiki. Crunchyroll licensed the series.

A fourth season of the series was announced on November 23, 2021. The season, titled , is produced by Hayabusa Film, with Creators in Pack credited with animation cooperation. The rest of the main staff and cast reprised their roles. It aired from April 9 to June 11, 2022. A special announcement program aired on April 2. The opening theme song is performed by Akira Ouse.

Series overview

Season 1

Season 2

Season 3

Season 4

Notes

References

External links
  
 

2019 anime television series debuts
Anime series based on manga
Crunchyroll anime
Ichijinsha manga
Shōnen manga
Television shows set in Aichi Prefecture
Yonkoma